Fairview Hospital is a private, non-profit 25-bed health care facility in Great Barrington, Massachusetts, owned by Berkshire Health Systems.

Accreditation
Fairview is a federally designated Critical Access Hospital, and is equipped with a Joint Commission-accredited Emergency Department.

See also
Berkshire Medical Center

References

External links
 Official website

Hospitals in Berkshire County, Massachusetts